The history of British Rail's corporate liveries is quite complex. Although from the mid-1960s to the 1980s the organisation was associated with "Rail Blue", a number of other schemes were also used, especially when it was split into operating units or "sectors" in the  mid-1980s.

Pre-corporate liveries
At the formation of British Railways on 1 January 1948, early diesel and electric locos and the gas turbine locomotives 18000 and 18100 were already painted black with aluminium trim, but by the late 1950s this had been superseded by the same shade of green that was used on express passenger steam locomotives, although some locomotives were painted in a two-tone Brunswick and Sherwood green livery, and Southern Region electric locomotives were painted a light shade of malachite green. Multiple units were also generally green, although this tended to be a lighter and bluer shade compared to the colour used on steam and diesel locomotives.

Corridor coaching stock was originally trialled in LNWR coach plum and off-white (nicknamed Plum and Spilt Milk) before Crimson (carmine red) and Cream livery (nicknamed Blood and Custard) was adopted across the network; non-corridor stock was painted plain Crimson.

In 1956 an all-over darker maroon, which more closely resembled the pre-nationalisation LMS livery, was re-introduced, except for the Southern Region, where locomotive-hauled stock was generally painted 'coaching stock' green (from July 1956-on) and a small number of express carriages on the Western Region which were in traditional GWR-style chocolate and cream.

With the reorganisation of British Railways in the mid-1960s, a complete break with the past was signalled by the introduction of a blue and grey livery which dominated all passenger rolling stock until the mid-1980s, when a new Intercity livery (dark grey and beige with a red and white waistband) was introduced along with a number of regional colour schemes.

Early liveries

The standard livery for most British Railways steam locomotives was black, often with a thin red, cream and grey "lining" (trim), while express passenger locomotives were not painted "Brunswick Green" (Which was the former colour of the Great Western Railway) as is often stated, but were painted in British Standards: BS224 "Deep Bronze Green" also known as "Land Rover Deep Bronze Green LR001" with orange and black lining. This error in colour identification comes from an article and question published in a Model Railway Magazine in the 1950s, where the responding editor made the error, and it has frequently been repeated since then. This has been confirmed by records held at the National Railway Museum. All Class 42 "Warship" class diesels were delivered in green but some Class 52s were delivered in maroon to match the then-standard coaching stock livery. This livery suited these diesel hydraulic classes, and allowed the Western Region to once again show a degree of independence; it was not applied to any other diesel or electric classes (other than the Class 42/43 "Warships"). 
The 25 kV electric locomotives were painted from new in a striking shade of bright blue which was known as "Electric Blue". They retained this livery for some years, before being painted in Rail Blue when that became the norm.

In 1964, as part of a plan to develop a new corporate image for British Railways, a number of experiments were tried;

Two Class 31 diesels were painted in trial liveries. No.D5578 was painted in an unlined 'Light Electric blue', and No.D5579 was painted in a colour variously described as 'Bronze Gold' and 'Golden Ochre'.
 The first Class 52 "Western" class, No.D1000 Western Enterprise was painted in a pale brown livery known as 'Desert Sand' livery when first delivered in 1961.
 Another Class 52, No.D1015 Western Champion was delivered in another, darker yellow/brown colour described as 'Golden Ochre', though somewhat different from that applied to D5579. These non-standard liveried "Western" diesel hydraulics were also fitted with the cast aluminium lion and wheel emblem that was standard issue on the 25 kV electric locomotives.

Coaching stock from 1948 

Discussions on the livery for British Railways coaching stock in 1948 eventually settled on a network-wide two-tone livery of crimson and cream for corridor coaches, with all-over crimson being used for local, non-corridor stock. The colours were chosen to be different from those of any of the "Big Four" pre-nationalisation railway companies while retaining a traditional aspect. However many people were not happy with the loss of the traditional "historic" regional colour schemes as used by the former private companies.

The second phase 

From 1956 maroon (similar to crimson lake) was adopted as the standard colour for coaching stock, with corridor coaches lined and non-corridor plain initially: later on all stock was lined. There was a return of some regional schemes: the Western Region turned out some Mk1 sets for named expresses in chocolate/cream, similar to that used by the GWR before nationalisation. Until the introduction of Mk1 catering vehicles in the late '50s, these trains had matching former GWR catering vehicles. The special saloons and a few other special coaches were also repainted in chocolate and cream but regular former GWR coaches carried maroon. From July 1956 the Southern Region began using a 'coaching stock' green that was somewhat darker than the malachite green colour of the old Southern Railway and this extended to former Southern vehicles as well as Mk1 stock.

For cost reasons, liveries were usually changed piecemeal, when coaches came in for scheduled maintenance. Coaches from different regions could also often find themselves coupled together and trains of 2 or 3 mixed liveries were not uncommon. Due to the consequent muddle of liveries, many trains began to get an untidy if not tatty appearance which added to the run-down image of the railway. The rebranding of British Railways to British Rail on 1 January 1965 was coupled with the introduction of an entirely new national livery.

XP64 

A mock-up for the British Railways Mark 2 stock was displayed at the Design Centre, 28 Haymarket, London, (the showrooms of the Council of Industrial Design) in 1964. This included many of the features which were later incorporated in the Mark 2, and trialled in an experimental train designated XP64. This mock-up was shown in an orange and grey livery, which, however, never appeared on rolling stock in service. The XP64 train was used to test technology and carriage arrangements for the planned Mark 2 coaches. The coaches for the XP64 train were painted in a slightly lighter version of what would eventually become Rail Blue, with a  Pale Ivory stripe centred on the passenger windows, and brown underframe.  One locomotive, Class 47 No.D1733, was painted to match the coaching stock. In 2001, as passenger work for diesel locomotives operated by Virgin CrossCountry came to an end, a number of their Class 47s were painted in "heritage" liveries that they had carried in the past, including the former D1733, now 47853, which once again carried a near-correct version of the XP64 livery.

Rail Blue 

Eventually, it was decided to standardise on a colour which became known as Rail Blue. Introduced in 1965, and also known as "Monastral Blue", the colour was defined by British Rail standards BR28/6001 (Airless spray finish) and BR28/5321 (Brush finish). It was a dark, greyish blue tone which hid the effects of dirt well. The colour often appears inaccurately in photographs, generally appearing brighter and bluer than the real colour. In the early years the colour faded quite badly, becoming lighter and paler with time although this problem had been overcome by the late 1970s. European paint code RAL5020 ("Ocean Blue") is a good match to Rail Blue. There is also a British Standard paint colour BS381C 114 called Rail Blue which was introduced in 1964. The new British Rail "double arrow" symbol on locomotives (or leading vehicle as was the case on multiple unit stock) and the vehicle number and other ancillary markings written in the Rail Alphabet typeface were other integral parts of the livery. This style of livery was also used by CSX Transportation.

Locomotives 
This colour was applied to all diesel and electric locomotives, with the exception of the ends, which were painted yellow to improve visibility, and the underframes and buffer beams which were painted black; the paints being to BSS 2660-0.003 and BSS 2660-9.103 respectively. As Rail Blue was introduced, the last locomotive recorded as being outshopped in a previous livery was Class 43 D838 Rapid which left Swindon Works in August 1968 in maroon.

The Vale of Rheidol Railway remained steam operated past the general end of steam traction in 1968; Accordingly the three remaining Vale of Rheidol Railway steam locomotives (Class 98) received the Rail Blue colour scheme and the double arrow logo on their side tanks. The smokebox, running plate, and running gear remained black, and the bufferbeam remained red.

Coaches and multiple units 
Corridor coaching stock and certain express multiple unit classes were painted in Rail Blue with a 44-inch Pearl Grey (BS 2660-9-095) horizontal panel centred vertically on the main windows, outlined by a narrow white line. This grey panel finished just short of the end of the coach leaving a small amount of Rail Blue which then continued round onto the end of the coach. Roofs were Dark Grey and underframes originally brown, but later black.

Non-corridor coaching stock and other multiple units received all-over Rail Blue until about 1980, when most received the same blue/grey livery as corridor coaching stock.

The 4REP and 3/4TC EMUs were a notable oddity, initially receiving all-over Rail Blue despite being express corridor stock. They were repainted into blue/grey in the early 1970s.

From 1974, some DMU sets, after being refurbished, were painted white with a wide blue band under the windows and full yellow ends.

From 1966 until withdrawal, Pullman Coaches were also painted in the reversal of the normal coach livery, with the blue and grey areas transposed. The Blue Pullman sets retained their livery of Nanking Blue (albeit with full yellow ends) until 1969 when they were repainted in the reversed grey and blue livery.

Local variations 

In 1977 two Class 47 locomotives, 47163 and 47164, were painted by Stratford TMD with silver roofs and other decorations including a full body height Union Flag on each side, in celebration of Queen Elizabeth II's silver jubilee. Several other Class 47 locomotives, some Class 31s, and even some DMU cabs, were subsequently also painted by Stratford with grey roofs, the variation becoming something of a trademark for the depot.

After this time small variations in the Rail Blue livery became much more common. Several Class 31 locomotives received white waist stripes, these being 
particularly associated with the depots at Old Oak Common and 
Finsbury Park. Also on the Eastern Region, Class 55 Deltic locomotives based at Finsbury Park acquired white surrounds to their cab windows.
Eastfield TMD staff near Glasgow also embellished a few examples of the class 37/0's allocated to the depot with a lower bodyside white stripe in the mid-80s but were told to stop doing it and repaint the ones they'd already done back to the standard blue livery by the BR hierarchy.

Moving away from Rail Blue 

The first break in the uniformity of Rail Blue came in 1976 with the introduction of the first InterCity 125 (HST). The distinctive angular shape of the HST power cars did not lend itself to applying yellow on the leading face, so the yellow was wrapped around and extended along the side of each power car, although the coaches retained the usual Rail Blue coaching stock livery.

In 1978 the British Railways Board began planning a new livery for the future, and in that August Class 56 diesel locomotive 56036 was painted to test a modified livery of all-over Rail Blue with the entire loco front in bright yellow to improve visibility, this extending down the sides of the loco to the rear of the cab windows which were, in turn, outlined in black. This livery was known as Large Logo livery as each side of the locomotive was dominated by a full body height BR double arrow symbol, and had the loco number prominently displayed at twice the previous size. This livery was well received by enthusiasts but as the Class 56s only hauled freight, it was decided to extend the experiment to a passenger loco. Thus Class 47 47170 County of Norfolk, allocated to Stratford and a regular performer on trains between Liverpool Street and Norwich, was painted in Large Logo livery. Initially new locos were still painted in the traditional Rail Blue livery, but starting with Class 56 number 56084 the new Large Logo version was standard on new locos delivered to BR.  After this date, the passenger versions of Class 37 and 47, as well as Class 50, were routinely outshopped in this livery.

Sectorisation

InterCity 

Following the introduction of the Advanced Passenger Train in 1983, a similar livery to the APT's (dark grey on the upper body, and light beige on the lower, with two stripes of red and white separating them) was experimentally applied to two HST sets and the coaches operating the Gatwick Express service between London Victoria and Gatwick Airport. This was referred to as the InterCity Executive livery as the sets used were dedicated to operating morning/evening services operated for businesspeople. Despite the InterCity brand having been introduced in 1966, in 1985 the word 'Executive' was dropped and the livery was applied to all coaches and many locomotives used on InterCity services.

London and South East

Launched as the London & South East Sector "Express Livery" this was a short-lived scheme which appeared on a limited amount of units and routes before the advent of Network SouthEast's "toothpaste" red white and blue striped livery.  The livery comprised brown upper panels with a colour described variously as "biscuit" or "fawn" along the lower panels and separated by a broad orange band. The livery derived its nickname from a perceived resemblance to the internal appearance of a Jaffa Cake. Variants where the band was blue (outer suburban) or green (inner suburban) instead of orange were planned, but never implemented.

The livery was applied only to some  "Clacton" units on the former Eastern Region and to a few of Classes 411 (4Cep), 419 (MLV) and 421 (4Cig) on the former Southern Region.

The Southern Region types worked mostly on the  /  -  via  / Dover and  routes and on the Victoria /  -  /  / Hastings via  routes. The new livery was used with the introduction of the Hastings Line electrification in 1986 to promote new electric trains on that line. The anniversary of the Battle of Hastings which took place in 1066 was also used in publicity for the line. Due to the small number of units repainted it was common to see trains with two or more units in different liveries.

Network SouthEast 

On 10 June 1986, British Rail launched Network SouthEast, an organisation designed to cut across the traditional regional boundaries and deliver a co-ordinated train service for London and the surrounding region. For this new venture a new livery - a paler shade of blue than Rail Blue, with three stripes of white, red and grey -  was created with Class 47 No.47573 The London Standard painted in the new livery specifically for the launch ceremony.  As well as rolling stock and multiple units, a number of Class 47 and Class 50 locomotives dedicated to Network SouthEast passenger services were painted in this livery.  A later version made minor changes to the livery, the main one of which was to darken the main shade of blue used. This livery is also often nicknamed 'toothpaste livery' by rail enthusiasts due to the multicoloured stripes resembling striped toothpaste.

ScotRail

ScotRail was the brand name under which British Rail operated passenger services in Scotland and cross border services to Northern England and London. A corporate livery was created for major express services in Scotland, which effectively consisted of the InterCity livery with the red stripe replaced by a light blue one.

Regional Railways 

Upon sectorisation, most secondary passenger routes which did not fall under the InterCity or Network SouthEast banner were re-designated as Regional Railways (originally Provincial).  A livery, similar to ScotRail but with the upper dark grey bodyside replaced with a dark blue, was created. A number of sets of coaching stock and a handful of locomotives received the livery, as well as most new multiple units and some existing ones.

Scottish rolling stock not covered by the ScotRail livery (generally those on secondary services) received the Regional Railways livery, but with "ScotRail" branding.

Rail Express Systems 

Rail Express Systems was the sector of British Rail responsible for transport of mail and parcels traffic. Its rolling stock initially carried the standard Rail Blue (or blue and grey) livery but in 1992, it introduced a new livery of red and grey, with pale blue and grey flashes.

The livery was carried on the rolling stock, but also on a number of locomotives which were dedicated to mail and parcels traffic, mainly of Classes 47 and 90.

Railfreight and associated liveries 

Railfreight livery, a colour scheme specifically for freight locomotives, was unveiled when Class 58 58001 drove through a plastic screen at Doncaster Works on 9 December 1982. While this livery had much in common with the "Large Logo" version of Rail Blue livery, including the yellow cabs and larger logo and numbers on the bodyside, the main colour was grey rather than blue. A later version added a red stripe along the lower edge of the locomotive bodyside.

When British Rail operations were divided into sectors in the mid-1980s, prior to privatisation, a new version of the Railfreight livery emerged giving the sectors individual identities. Consisting of three shades of grey and thus known as "triple grey Railfreight", the livery included logos on the sides and cabs of locomotives indicating which sector they belonged to. For locomotives used on internal British Rail duties, a separate livery of a plain darker grey was created. This was later modified for locomotives allocated to the Civil Engineer's department to include a yellow stripe on the upper bodyside, the resulting livery being known as "Dutch" due to its similarity to the corporate colours of the Nederlandse Spoorwegen.

Gallery

References

External links 

 History of Blood and Custard (Crimson Lake & Cream) Livery
 Information on Freight Locomotive Liveries & logos

British Rail brands
Rail liveries